Pius Henry Kisambale (born 21 December 1987) is a retired Tanzanian football striker.

References

1987 births
Living people
Tanzanian footballers
Tanzania international footballers
Simba S.C. players
Moro United F.C. players
Mtibwa Sugar F.C. players
JKT Ruvu Stars players
Young Africans S.C. players
Coastal Union F.C. players
Saraswoti Youth Club players
Association football forwards
Tanzanian expatriate footballers
Expatriate footballers in Nepal
Tanzanian expatriate sportspeople in Nepal
Expatriate footballers in Hong Kong
Tanzanian expatriate sportspeople in Hong Kong
Tanzanian Premier League players